Columbia Jazz Masterpieces was a series of Jazz CD, LP and cassette reissues from Columbia Records which began in 1986.   Written inside the blue box used on all the album covers "Digitally Remastered Directly from the Original Analog Tapes." In Europe, the series was known as CBS Jazz Masterpieces, with the reissues being released by CBS Records, until 1991, when the Columbia Jazz Masterpieces title was used on all subsequent releases and represses.

Discography
Armstrong, Louis and His All Stars - Louis Armstrong Plays W.C. Handy
Armstrong, Louis and His All Stars - Satch Plays Fats
Armstrong, Armstrong - Volume I through VII (comps of Hot Five and other material)
Baker, Chet - With Strings
Basie, Count - The Essential, Vol I
Basie, Count - The Essential, Vol II
Basie, Count - The Essential, Vol III
Beiderbecke, Bix - Singin' the Blues 1 and At The Jazz Band Ball 2
Blakey, Art - The Jazz Messengers
Brubeck, Dave - Gone With The Wind
Brubeck, Dave - The Great Concerts
Brubeck, Dave - Interchanges '54
Brubeck, Dave - Jazz Goes to College
Brubeck, Dave - Jazz Impressions of New York
Brubeck, Dave - Time Out
Brubeck, Dave - West Side Story
Brubeck, Dave - Dave Digs Disney (CBS 471250 2, 1994)'
Bryant, Ray - Con Alma
Christian, Charlie - Genius of the Electric Guitar
Clayton, Buck - Jam Sessions From The Vault
Condon, Eddie & His All-Stars - Dixieland Jam
Davis, Miles - 58 Sessions
Davis, Miles - Ballads
Davis, Miles - Bitches Brew
Davis, Miles - Cookin' at the Plugged Nickel
Davis, Miles - In a Silent Way
Davis, Miles - In Person Friday and Saturday Nights at the Blackhawk
Davis, Miles - Kind of Blue
Davis, Miles - Live Miles, More Music from Carnegie Hall
Davis, Miles - Miles Ahead
Davis, Miles - Miles & Coltrane
Davis, Miles - Miles in the Sky
Davis, Miles - Milestones
Davis, Miles - On the Corner
Davis, Miles - Porgy and Bess
Davis, Miles - Round About Midnight
Davis, Miles - Sketches of Spain
Davis, Miles - Someday My Prince Will Come
Davis, Miles - Sorcerer
Davis, Miles - "Seven Steps to Heaven" (CBS 466970 2, 1992)
Eldridge, Roy - Little Jazz, Uptown (w/Gene Krupa & Anita O'Day)
Ellington, Duke - Blues in Orbit
Ellington, Duke - The Duke's Men Vol 1 & 2
Ellington, Duke - Ellington at Newport
Ellington, Duke - Ellington Indigos
Ellington, Duke - Ellington Uptown
Ellington, Duke and Basie, Count - First Time! The Count Meets the Duke
Ellington, Duke - Jazz Party
Ellington, Duke - The Okeh Ellington
Ellington, Duke - Three Suites
Garner, Erroll - Body and Soul
Garner, Erroll - Concert by the Sea
Garner, Erroll - Long Ago and Far Away
Getz, Stan - Lyrical
Goodman, Benny - The Benny Goodman Sextet Featuring Charlie Christian: 1939-1941
Goodman, Benny - Benny Goodman Sextet (CBS 450411 2, 1987)
Goodman, Benny - Live at Carnegie Hall
Goodman, Benny - On the Air 1937-1938
Goodman, Benny - Slipped Disc
Goodman, Benny - Small Groups 1941-45
Goodman, Benny - Vol I, Roll 'Em
Goodman, Benny - Vol II, Clarinet A La King
Goodman, Benny - Vol III, All The Cats Join In
Gordon, Dexter - Homecoming
Hayes, Tubby w/Clark Terry - The New York Sessions
Herman, Woody - The Thundering Herds
Hines, Earl - Live at the Village Vanguard
Holiday, Billie - Lady in Satin
Holiday, Billie - The Quintessential, Vols. 1-9
Johnson, J. J. - The Trombone Master
Lambert, Hendricks & Ross - Everybody's Boppin'''
Mingus, Charles - Ah UmMingus, Charles - Let My Children Hear MusicMingus, Charles - Mingus Dynasty (also released as Shoes of the Fisherman)
Monk, Thelonious - ComposerMonk, Thelonious - Criss-CrossMonk, Thelonious - Monk's DreamMonk, Thelonious - StandardsMonk, Thelonious - UndergroundRouse, Charlie - Unsung HeroSmith, Bessie - CollectionSmith, Willie w/the Harry James Orchestra - Snooty FruityWebster, Ben - Ben and "Sweets"Various artistsThe Bebop EraThe Jazz Arranger, Vol 1 & 2The Sound Of JazzSample Vol IV through IVThe Jazz MastersJazz Masterpieces Sampler Vol IJazz Masterpieces Sampler Vol IIJazz Masterpieces Sampler Vol IIIJazz Masterpieces Sampler Vol IVJazz Masterpieces Sampler Vol VThe 1930s - Big BandsThe 1930s - Small CombosThe 1930s - The SingersThe 1940s - The Small Groups: New DirectionsThe 1940s - The SingersThe 1950s - The Singers''

American record labels
 
 
Jazz record labels